Bankia may refer to:

Biology
 Bankia (bivalve), a genus of ship-worms, marine bivalve molluscs of the family Teredinidae
 Bankia (moth), a synonym of the moth genus Deltote in the family Noctuidae

Organizations
 Bankia, a Spanish financial conglomerate

Locations
 Bankya (sometimes spelled Bankia), a town in Bulgaria